The Laureus Spirit of Sport Award is an award honouring "those individual athletes or teams who, through their remarkable success, their refusal to accept defeat or their unquestionable contribution to the enjoyment of the game". It was first awarded in 2005 as one of the discretionary awards presented during the Laureus World Sports Awards. The awards are presented by the Laureus Sport for Good Foundation, a global organisation involved in more than 150 charity projects supporting 500,000 young people. The first ceremony was held on 25 May 2000 in Monte Carlo, at which Nelson Mandela gave the keynote speech. The recipient is presented with a Laureus statuette, created by Cartier, at an annual awards ceremony held in various locations around the world. Although the Laureus Awards ceremony is held annually, the Spirit of Sport Award is not necessarily presented every time; it is one of a number of discretionary awards that can be given by the Laureus World Sports Academy. Since its establishment, no award has been made six times, in 2009, 2010, 2012, 2013, 2018 and 2020.

The inaugural winner of the Laureus Spirit of Sport Award in 2005 was the American baseball team Boston Red Sox who won their first World Series for 86 years in the 2004 Major League Baseball season. , five teams and four individuals have received the award.  One of these individuals was honoured posthumously: Dutch former footballer and coach Johan Cruyff won the accolade in 2016, having died the previous month; his award was presented to his son Jordi Cruyff by fellow Dutchman Ruud Gullit at the ceremony in Berlin.  No award was made in 2020; the most recent recipient of the Laureus Spirit of Sport Award was the American alpine skier Lindsey Vonn in 2019.

Recipients

References

Spirit of Sport Award
Awards established in 2005